The All-Ireland Senior Hurling Championship 1979 was the sixth series of the All-Ireland Senior B Hurling Championship, Ireland's secondary hurling knock-out competition.  Laois won the championship, beating London 1-20 to 0-17 in a replay of the final at Geraldine Park, Athy.

Results

All-Ireland Senior B Hurling Championship

Sources

 Donegan, Des, The Complete Handbook of Gaelic Games (DBA Publications Limited, 2005).

1979
B